The 2020–21 Big South Conference men's basketball season began with practices in October 2020, followed by the start of the 2020–21 NCAA Division I men's basketball season in November. Conference play begins in January 2021 and will conclude in March 2021.

Preseason Awards
The preseason coaches' poll was announced by the league office on November 10, 2020.

Preseason men's basketball coaches poll
(First place votes in parenthesis)
 Winthrop (21) 261
 UNC Asheville (2) 214
 Charleston Southern 192
 Gardner-Webb (1) 188
 USC Upstate 149
 Radford 127
 High Point 117
 Longwood 111
 Hampton 92
 Campbell 78
 Presbyterian 55

Honors
Preseason honors were announced by the league office on November 10, 2020.

Conference matrix

All-Big South awards

Big South men's basketball weekly awards

References